Zoolook is the seventh studio album by French electronic musician and composer Jean-Michel Jarre, released in November 1984 by Disques Dreyfus. Much of the music is built up from singing and speech in 25 different languages recorded and edited in the Fairlight CMI digital sampling synthesizer. The album spawned two singles: the title track and "Zoolookologie".

Composition and recording
Zoolook was greatly influenced by his former mentor Pierre Schaeffer and his musique concrète, taking samples from everyday life and voice human in 25 different languages from all over the world. In this album was expanded the sample-based approach which had been initiated on Les Chants Magnétiques (1981) and continued on Music for Supermarkets (1983). Some fragments were recorded digitally by Jarre and then played back and edited on the Fairlight CMI. This process was done together with Frederick Rousseau for three months.

Some of the vocals were recorded during Jean-Michel's travels, others instead are the result of his work with the French ethnologist, Xavier Bellanger, who during his travels recorded "a large collection of tapes." For this album, Jarre used the synthesizers Moog 55, ARP 2600, some by EMS, the LinnDrum machine, the Yamaha DX7, the Matrisequencer 250 designed by the French sound engineer, Michel Geiss for Équinoxe (1978), and the E-mu Emulator. The different languages as listed in the album's liner notes are: Aboriginal, Afghan, Arabic, Balinese, Bangladeshi, Chinese, Dutch, English, Eskimo, French, German, Hungarian, Indian, Japanese, Malagasy, Malayan, Pygmy, Polish, Quechua, Russian, Sioux, Spanish, Swedish, Tibetan, and Turkish. 

Much of the album's recording took place both Jarre's makeshift studio in Paris. Sound engineer Denis Vanzetto joined the Jarre team, and later going to the Clinton studio, New York for recording American musicians chosen by Jean-Michel among them guitarists Adrian Belew and Ira Siegel, bassist Marcus Miller, and percussionist and drummer Yogi Horton. After Jean-Michel read in an American newspaper, The Village Voice about a exhibition held by the avant-garde singer Laurie Anderson in a New York gallery. He called and invited her to the studio to listen to his demos. Seduced by Jarre's proposed idea of speaking a completely imaginary language, she agreed and provided the vowels for the track "Diva". Parts of the album, like the track "Blah Blah Café" and the second half of the track "Diva", were reworkings of material that had already appeared on the 1983 album Musique pour Supermarché. The album was mixed by David Lord (except "Zoolookologie") at Jean Michel Jarre's home studio in Croissy, France (credited as Croissy Studio): final mixing started at Trident Studios in London but didn't go well for technical reasons, so it was decided to mix the album at Jarre's home studio instead.

Release
Zoolook was released in November 1984 on Disques Dreyfus label, and launched worldwide in September 1985 by Polydor Records label. More aurally challenging than Jarre's previous works, the album was also somewhat less successful, reaching only number 47 in the UK album charts. Two singles from the album were released, the title track and "Zoolookologie". Both had a music video in 1985, the title track video was directed by Jean-Pierre Jeunet, and featured twelve robots designed by Marc Caro of which only one was kept after filming. The video of "Zoolookologie" was directed by Rod McCall and produced by Frank Coppola in London, UK. It "shows three models flirting with the artist in a provocative fantasy". 

In 1984, the album won the Grand Prix du Disque award by L'Académie Charles Cros, and in April 1985 it won the best instrumental album of the year award, at the Victoires de la Musique. In 2016, a contest called Zoolook Revisited was organized, in which amateur or professional producers were invited to share a piece using samples taken from the SoundHunters app. Tracks from selected winners such as Luke Vibert, Zeka Lopez, Mikael Seifu, Simonne Jones and KIZ by Jean-Michel himself were included on the disc of the same name.

Critical reception

At the time of its release NME said, "Strangely simplistic, this LP is like a union between Scary Monsters (and Super Creeps) and Kraftwerk on speed". Australian newspaper The Evening News commented that "is a phonetic symphony laced with catchy, funk-rock rhythms based on the intonations of various exotic languages." 

In France, Le Devoir felt that the beginning of the album was "a musical background both morbid and grandiose." In Mojo magazine, Phil Alexander listed it as one of Jarre's three key albums and wrote that Jarre's rumination on internationalism also boasts a deliberate melodic focus that acknowledges the influence of synth pop, while pointing the way forward to greater experimentation – both in his own work and that of others." 

AllMusic's John Bush stated which "Jean Michel Jarre combined an actual band and processed vocal samples -- recorded in 25 different languages -- with his rich, melodic synthesizer pop", described the album as "interesting throughout" and added that "the tracks with Jarre alone are often the best, reprising the classic Oxygène sound." "Zoolookologie" was described by Thom Holmes as a, "A fascinating exploration of samples both of voice and drums".

Track listing

First edition – original track list (1984)

Second edition (1985)

Third edition (1997 remaster)

Fourth edition (30th anniversary, 2015 remaster)

Personnel
Personnel listed in album liner notes.
 Jean-Michel Jarre – keyboards, electronic devices
 Daniel Lazerus – sound engineer
 Laurie Anderson – vocals on "Diva"
 Adrian Belew – guitars, effects
 Yogi Horton – drums
 Marcus Miller – bass guitar
 Frederick Rousseau – additional keyboards
 Ira Siegel – additional guitars
 Xavier Bellenger – research
 David Lord – mixing engineer

Equipment
Adapted from album liner notes.
 Linn LM-1
 LinnDrum
 Simmons SDS-V
 Eminent 310 Unique
 Garfield Electronics Doctor Click
 E-mu Emulator
 Matrisequencer 250
 Fairlight CMI
 ARP 2600
 EMS Synthi AKS
 Moog 55
 Oberheim OB-Xa
 Sequential Circuits Prophet-5
 Yamaha DX7
 EMS Vocoder

Charts

Certifications

References

Bibliography

External links
 

1984 albums
Jean-Michel Jarre albums
Electronic albums by French artists
Electropop albums
New-age albums by French artists
Disques Dreyfus albums
Polydor Records albums